The M/V Island Gwawis is the sixth vessel in the Island Class Ferry series, owned and operated by BC Ferries. Built by Damen Shipyards in 2021, this vessel is part of the second phase of Island Class vessels. The Gwawis was launched as Island 6 on April 22, 2021, left Galați, Romania, on October 13, 2021, and arrived at Point Hope Shipyard, Victoria, British Columbia on December 23, 2021. On January 11, 2022, Island 6 was christened and renamed Island Gwawis by BC Ferries Director of Fleet Operations and Strategy, and First People's Cultural Council Special Advisor Cathi Charles Wherry. Gwawis means "raven of the sea" in the Kwakwaka'wakw indigenous language.

Naming controversy 
The name Island Gwawis received backlash from Snuneymuxw First Nation. On the day after the name was released, Chief Mike Wyse issued a statement saying that he was "saddened and frustrated" that the ferry company "decided to choose a racist and discriminatory path riddled with colonial acts that is woefully inflammatory and offensive to building a relationship between" them and BC Ferries. The indigenous group believed that the vessel should've been named in the Snuneymuxw language, as the ferry would be sailing in their traditional waters. BC Ferries noted that vessels are no longer named by their service regions, and are standardized, likely to be moved around the fleet when needed.

Service history 
Island Gwawis entered service with its sister ship Island Kwigwis on April 12, 2022, replacing the Quinsam on the Nanaimo - Gabriola Island route. The vessel overnights next to the Nanaimo Harbour ferry terminal.

References

Ships of BC Ferries
Island Class ferries
Damen Group
2021 ships